Pibbon, New South Wales is a bounded rural locality and a civil parish of Gowen County, New South Wales.

Pibbon is in Gilgandra Shire located at 31°34′54″S 149°04′04″E and named for the Pibbon run established in the 19th century.

References

Localities in New South Wales
Geography of New South Wales
Central West (New South Wales)